The discography of The Cat Empire, an Australian alternative rock group, consists of eight studio albums, five live albums, and eighteen singles.

Studio albums

Live albums

Compilation albums

Video albums

Singles

2000s

2010s

2020s 

 All 2021 singles released as part of the "Into the Night" playlist on Spotify, Boomplay and YouTube.

Notes

Other releases 
 "The Jazz Cat" (1999)
 Felix Riebl, Will Hull-Brown, Ryan Monro, Ollie McGill, Ross Irwin, Bed Edgar, Eric Budd, Tarko Sibbel and Lachlan McLean.
 "Demo/The Cat Empire" (2000)
 Felix Riebl, Ollie McGill and Ryan Monro
 "The Cat Empire II" (2000)
 Felix Riebl, Ollie McGill and Ryan Monro
 "Tapes, Breaks and Out-Takes" (2003)
 "Touring Europe and the UK, 2004" (2004)
 "The Cat Empire (EP)" (2006)
 "Live at Martyrs'" (2007)
 "ASYLUM" (2011)

Bootlegs 
Many bootlegs in both audio and video format have been made of The Cat Empire concerts and recording sessions. Some more notable recordings include entire live recordings of Bennetts Lane Jazz Club gigs and video footage of their performances at various venues such as the Coogee Bay Hotel and Darling Harbour in 2004.

Live website releases 
Released in 2007
 "So Many Nights" (recorded at Burnie, Tasmania, 2007)
Released in 2009
 "The Car Song" (recorded at Sydney Metro, 2007)
 "The Night That Never End" (recorded in 2005)
Released in 2010
 "Beyond All" (featured on the album "Cinema")

References 

Discographies of Australian artists
Rock music discographies